Giuseppe Tamborini (born March 19, 1943 in Lacchiarella) is an Italian former football coach and professional player who played as a midfielder. He played for 9 seasons (257 games, 19 goals) in Serie A for Sampdoria, Roma and Varese.

References

1943 births
Living people
Italian footballers
Association football midfielders
U.C. Sampdoria players
A.S. Roma players
S.S.D. Varese Calcio players
Reggina 1914 players
U.S. Cremonese players
A.C. Belluno 1905 players
A.S.D. SolbiaSommese Calcio players
Serie A players
Serie B players
Italian football managers